Sugaring is a food preservation method similar to pickling.  Sugaring is the process of desiccating a food by first dehydrating it, then packing it with pure sugar.  This sugar can be crystalline in the form of table or raw sugar, or it can be dense liquid saturated with sugar such as honey, syrup or molasses.

Sugaring creates a hostile  environment to microbial life, and is commonly used to preserve fruits as well as vegetables such as ginger.  There are also applications of sugaring for non-food preservations.  For instance, honey was used as part of the mummification process in some ancient Egyptian rites.

A risk in sugaring is that sugar itself attracts moisture.  Once a sufficient moisture level is reached, native yeast in the environment comes out of dormancy and begins to ferment the sugars into alcohol and carbon dioxide.  This leads to the process of fermentation.  Although fermentation can also be used as a food preservation method, it must be controlled, or the results could be unpleasant.

References

Food preservation
Sugar